Nicolás Adrián Oroz (born 1 April 1994) is an Argentine professional footballer who plays as an attacking midfielder for Racing Club.

Career 
Born in Villa Mercedes, San Luis, he became The Academy in his teens, where 19 Date Closing tournament debut against Godoy Cruz de Mendoza where replacement Roger Martinez where Racing lost 2 to 1. After 10 minutes juice Copa Argentina coming off the bench replacing nothing less than a Diego Milito where his team was victorious 1–0 against San Martín (SJ).

For the First Division Championship 2014 (Argentina) played in the match Racing won 2–1 to mouth having an acceptable performance. Against Atlético Rafaela again replaces Diego Milito in defeat 2 to 0. Play his fifth game against Olimpo de Bahia Blanca in the tie 1-1 where replacement Luciano Aued. Despite playing only 3 games, 20 years and a long future ahead champion after 13 years with ''The academy

National titles

References

External links
 

1994 births
Living people
Argentine footballers
Argentine expatriate footballers
People from Villa Mercedes, San Luis
Association football midfielders
Racing Club de Avellaneda footballers
Chacarita Juniors footballers
O'Higgins F.C. footballers
Universidad de Chile footballers
Al-Wasl F.C. players
Volos N.F.C. players
UAE Pro League players
Chilean Primera División players
Argentine Primera División players
Argentine expatriate sportspeople in Chile
Argentine expatriate sportspeople in the United Arab Emirates
Argentine expatriate sportspeople in Greece
Expatriate footballers in Chile
Expatriate footballers in the United Arab Emirates
Expatriate footballers in Greece